Ovid L. Jackson,  (born February 3, 1939, New Amsterdam, Berbice, Guyana) is a Canadian politician.  He represented the federal riding of Bruce—Grey and Bruce—Grey—Owen Sound in the House of Commons for the Liberal Party from 1994 to 2004.

Jackson, originally from Guyana, was a school teacher at West Hill Secondary School in Owen Sound.  He was then elected mayor of the city, serving for 10 years before being elected to parliament in the 1993 election.  He lost his seat to Conservative candidate Larry Miller in the 2004 election.

References

1939 births
Black Canadian politicians
Liberal Party of Canada MPs
Living people
Mayors of Owen Sound
Members of the House of Commons of Canada from Ontario
Members of the Order of Ontario
21st-century Canadian politicians